Huzurnagar Assembly constituency is a constituency of the Telangana Legislative Assembly, India. It is one of 4 constituencies in the Suryapet district. It is part of Nalgonda Lok Sabha constituency.

Mandals 
After the recent delimitation, Huzurnagar Assembly Constituency comprises the following Mandals: Huzurnagar, Neredcherla, Garidepally, Mattampally, Mellachervu, Chinthalapalem and Palakeedu.

Election results

Members

Bypoll 2019

Assembly election 2018

Assembly election 2014

Assembly election, 2009

See also
 List of constituencies of Telangana Legislative Assembly
 Huzurnagar

References

Assembly constituencies of Telangana
Assembly constituencies of Nalgonda district